Goedenia steyskali is a species of tephritid or fruit flies in the genus Goedenia of the family Tephritidae.

Distribution
California.

References

Tephritinae
Insects described in 2002
Diptera of North America